Isa Barzizza (born 22 November 1929) is an Italian actress who has appeared in 46 films since 1947.

Life and career

Early life
Born in Sanremo, Barzizza is the daughter of the conductor and composer Pippo Barzizza.  She started working in amateur dramatics at very young age, and she made her professional debut while still being a high school student, notably working with the stage companies led by Ruggero Ruggeri, Elsa Merlini and by the brothers Eduardo, Peppino and Titina De Filippo.

Breakout and success

Barzizza had her breakout in 1946, when during a visit to her father she was noted by Erminio Macario who chose her for the revue Follie d'Amleto. In a few years she established herself as a star in the revue genre, working several times with Macario, Totò and Wanda Osiris. Following her stage success, Barzizza also started a busy film career in the comedic genre, often teaming with Totò. In 1955, she starred in Valentina, which is considered the first genuine stage musical comedy produced in Italy.

Marriage and semi-retirement
In 1953 Barzizza married the screenwriter and director Carlo Alberto Chiesa, and following the birth of their daughter Carlotta she retired from showbusiness. In 1960 the couple were involved in a car  accident and Chiesa died shortly later under the knife. Widowed, Barzizza run a company of dubbing and production of television series. Starting from the mid-1970s she made sporadic appearances in films and on television.

Selected filmography

 The Two Orphans (1947) - Matilde
 Dove sta Zaza? (1947) - Zazà
 Fear and Sand (1948) - Patricia Cotten
 Toto Tours Italy (1948) - Doriana
 The Firemen of Viggiù (1949) - Toto's conquest
 Adam and Eve (1949) - Eva Bianchi
 I'm in the Revue (1950) - Cleo - la kleptomane
 The Merry Widower (1950) - Lucy
The Elusive Twelve (1950) - Teresa
 Figaro Here, Figaro There (1950) - Rosina
 Bluebeard's Six Wives (1950) - Lana Ross
 Milano miliardaria (1951) - Vittorio Pizzigoni
 Seven Hours of Trouble (1951) - Amelia
 The Reluctant Magician (1951) - Perla
 Era lui... sì! sì! (1951) - Grazia
 Porca miseria (1951) - Jenny Soleri
 Toto in Color (1952) - La signora del vagone-letto
 Five Paupers in an Automobile (1952) - Cicci
 We're Dancing on the Rainbow (1952) - Jeannette
 Primo premio: Mariarosa (1952)
 Beauties on Motor Scooters (1952) - Laura
 Gioventù alla sbarra (1953) - Florence, la canzonettista
 Siamo tutti inquilini (1953) - Collega di Anna
 It's Never Too Late (1953) - Rosanna Gennari
 The Daughter of the Regiment (1953) - Kiki
 Neapolitan Turk (1953) - Giulietta
 Viva la rivista! (1953)
 Canzoni a due voci (1953) - La fidanzata del baritono
 Gran Varietà (1954)
 Appassionatamente (1954) - Ortensia Dupré
 Toto Seeks Peace (1954) - Cousin Nella Caporali
 Cartouche (1955) - Lucilla
 Un palco all'opera (1955)
 I pinguini ci guardano (1956)
 We All Loved Each Other So Much (1974) - Elena
 Garofano rosso (1976)
 Il momento dell'avventura (1983) - Antonia Belli
 Fiori di zucca (1989) - Clelia
 Grazie al cielo c'è Totò (1991)
 80 mq - Ottantametriquadri (1993) - Mamma di Raffaele (segment "No mamma no")
 Ardena (1997) - Lea
 Asini (1999) - Italo's mother
 Seven Kilometers from Jerusalem (2007) - Elvira Marenghi
 Una sconfinata giovinezza (2010)
 Maledimiele (2011) - Nonna
 Viva l'Italia (2012) - Marisa
 Mia (2012)
 Studio illegale (2013) - Zia Emma
 Indovina chi viene a Natale? (2013) - Emma

References

External links

1929 births
Living people
People from Sanremo
Italian film actresses
20th-century Italian actresses
Italian stage actresses
Italian television actresses